The term Sincennes can mean:

Surnames 
 Jacques-Félix Sincennes (1818-1876), businessman and Conservative MP for Richelieu in the Union (1858-1861). He co-founded a shipping company of towing (Sincennes MacNaughton-Line) and director of the company Richelieu. In 1875, he co-founded the shipping company Richelieu and Ontario whish will become the Canada Steamship Lines.
 Louis Sincennes is a film actor, known for "20h17 rue Darling" (2003), "The implementation blind" (2012) and Tol (2007).

Companies 
 Sincennes-McNaughton Lines Ltd. Canadian company based in Montreal and has operated merchant ships.
 Sincennes McNaughton Tugs (Montreal, Quebec), a Canadian company specializing in maritime transportation.

Place Names 
 Sincennes Lake, located in the territory of La Tuque, in Upper Mauricie, in Quebec, in Canada.
 Sincennes Township, located in the unorganized territory of Lac-Normand in Mékinac Regional County Municipality, in Mauricie, in the province of Quebec, in Canada.